The Indiana Hoosiers softball team represents Indiana University Bloomington in NCAA Division I college softball.  The team participates in the Big Ten Conference. The Hoosiers are currently led by head coach Shonda Stanton. The team plays its home games at Andy Mohr Field located on the university's campus.

History

Coaching history

Championships

Conference Championships

Coaching staff

Awards
Big Ten Player of the Year
Michelle Venturella, 1994

Big Ten Pitcher of the Year
Gina Ugo, 1996
Morgan Melloh, 2011

Big Ten Freshman of the Year
Tammy Connor, 1985

Big Ten Coach of the Year
Diane Stephenson, 1994

References